The 1975–76 Serie A season was the 42nd season of the Serie A, the top level of ice hockey in Italy. Nine teams participated in the league, and HC Gherdeina won the championship.

Final round

Placing round

External links
 Season on hockeytime.net

1975–76 in Italian ice hockey
Serie A (ice hockey) seasons
Italy